is a Japanese motorcycle racer, competing in the All Japan Road Race JSB1000 Championship aboard a Kawasaki ZX-10R. He has competed in the GP125 and J-GP2 classes of the All Japan Road Race Championship, as well as in the ST600 class, where he was champion in 2013.

Career statistics

Grand Prix motorcycle racing

By season

Races by year

References

External links

1990 births
Living people
Japanese motorcycle racers
125cc World Championship riders